The American Pianists Association is a performing arts organization based in Indianapolis, Indiana, USA, that holds two national, quadrennial piano competitions in alternating 2-year cycles: the Classical Fellowship Awards and the Jazz Fellowship Awards. Only American citizens ages 18–30 are eligible to compete. The organization hosts a recital series in non-competition years. The Fellowship Awards are among the most lucrative piano prizes in the world, valued at over $100,000.

History 
The association was "born" in New York City in 1979 as the Beethoven Foundation, conceived by the late Victor Borge, Tony Habig of Kimball International and Julius Bloom, former general manager of Carnegie Hall. Their original intent was to help identify and groom young American pianists to compete in international piano competitions by offering fellowships over a three-year period that included cash awards, concerts and media coverage. It changed its name to The American Pianists Association in 1989 and added a jazz competition in 1992.

In 1982, the Beethoven Foundation moved its national headquarters to Indianapolis, partly because of geographical ties by two of its founders, Habig and Borge. Now the executive offices are a part of the Arts Collaborative housed in Lilly Hall at Butler University. In 1989, the name was changed to American Pianists Association to reflect a broader scope that included jazz pianists, and the mission also has broadened beyond the original purpose.

From 2003 through 2008, the American Pianists Association produced Indy Jazz Fest.

APA has collaborated with the Cultural Programs Division of the U.S. Department of State, which has sponsored Classical and Jazz Fellows, as well as Harrison, in international tours since 2003. All total, they have together or separately visited 10 countries worldwide.

Competitions 

Finalists compete through a series of adjudicated public recitals. The classical competition includes solo piano, chamber music, collaborative vocal, and concerto performances and ends with each finalist performing a concerto with the Indianapolis Symphony Orchestra. The jazz competition includes repertoire for solo piano, jazz trio, vocal jazz, and jazz orchestra.

American Pianists Awards winners 

Source:

References 

Organizations established in 1979
Music organizations based in the United States
Organizations based in Indianapolis
Piano competitions